Edward Hilliard (3 April 1851 – 18 September 1936) was a Seventh-day Adventist missionary from America who worked in Australia, India and Tonga.
He was the first resident Seventh-day Adventist missionary on Tonga, and founded the Seventh-day Adventist Church in Tonga.

Missionary

Edward Hilliard was born on 3 April 1851 in Madrid, St. Lawrence County, New York.
His parents were converted to Adventism when he was a child, and he was brought up in that faith.
He became an Adventist pastor.
In 1895 the Mission Board sent him to Tonga, then called the Friendly Islands, as a missionary.
Adventists on the schooner Pitcairn had first visited Tongatapu, the main island of the Kingdom of Tonga, in 1891.

Hilliard arrived at Tongatapu on 30 August 1895 with his wife Ida Hilliard and their two-year-old daughter Alta.
They lived in temporary quarters while Edward Hilliard built a four-room cottage.
Around November 1895 Ida Hilliard began to teach school, first in their temporary home and then in their cottage.
The number of pupils reached a peak of 28, each paying $3 per quarter.
Hilliard built a small school room  near his cottage.
The Hilliards brought two Tongan boys into their home to try to train them as missionaries. 
To earn extra income Hilliard worked part-time as a carpenter.
He slowly learned the Tongan language and translated some tracts into this language. 
Hilliard's work was mainly limited to the small papalagi (European) colony on "the beach".
He was no longer young and found the local language difficult.

In August 1896 Edwin Butz and his wife Florence arrived on the fifth voyage of the Pitcairn.  
They were accompanied by two Pitcairn Islanders, Sarah and Maria Young, descendants of Bounty mutineer, midshipman Ned Young. 
In 1897 Dr. Merritt Kellogg and Eleanor Kellogg joined them.
In these early years the missionaries made little progress, in part handicapped by their dietary regulations.
Drinking kava and eating pork are important in Tongan social life but are prohibited by the Adventists.
Before Hilliard left Tonga in 1899 he reported that a Sabbath School with 31 members met regularly. 
Most of the attendees were the missionaries and the school children. The children's parents only attended occasionally.
On 10 September 1899, shortly before leaving Tonga, Hilliard gathered the missionaries into his home and organized them into a church. 
The Butz and Kellogg families were the charter members.

Later years

After four years in Tonga the Hilliards moved to Australia for eight years, then spent thirteen years in Tasmania.
Sarah Young accompanied the Hilliards to Australia where she completed her training as a nurse.
A young part-Tongan called David or Horace Holland also sailed to Australia with the Hilliards, and studied at Avondale College from 1900–01.
He was baptized, but later broke the school's rule and left.

In 1928 Hilliard moved to Bangalore, India with his wife, daughter and son-in-law Pastor Christiansen.
Hilliard suffered from heart disease. He died in Bangalore on 18 September 1936, aged 85.
The Hobart Seventh-Day Adventist school near Hobart, Tasmania was renamed on 1 September 1994 to the Hilliard Christian School in honor of Edward Hilliard, who had led the Seventh-day Adventist church in Tasmania for four years.

See also

 General Conference of Seventh-day Adventists
 Seventh-day Adventist Church
 Ellen G. White
 Seventh-day Adventist eschatology
 Seventh-day Adventist theology
 Seventh-day Adventist worship
 Annie R. Smith
 History of the Seventh-day Adventist Church
 28 fundamental beliefs
 Pillars
 Second Advent
 Baptism by Immersion
 Conditional Immortality
 Historicism
 Three Angels' Messages
 End times
 Sabbath in Seventh-day Adventism
 Adventist

References

Sources

1851 births
1936 deaths
People from St. Lawrence County, New York
American Seventh-day Adventist missionaries
Seventh-day Adventist missionaries in Tonga
Seventh-day Adventist missionaries in Australia
Seventh-day Adventist missionaries in India
American expatriates in Australia
American expatriates in Tonga